The Horseshoe Dam is a dam located North of Phoenix, Arizona. The dam forms the Horseshoe Lake as it slows the passage of the Verde River. The dam was listed on the National Register of Historic Places in 2017.

Just below Horseshoe Dam is excellent fishing – popular spots include Catfish Point and Mesquite Cove.

External links
 HookedAZ Fishing Community | Horseshoe Lake
 SRP Horseshoe Dam

Dams in Arizona
Buildings and structures in Maricopa County, Arizona
United States Bureau of Reclamation dams
Dams completed in 1946
National Register of Historic Places in Maricopa County, Arizona
Dams on the National Register of Historic Places in Arizona
1946 establishments in Arizona